The Florida version of the NWA World Tag Team Championship was the primary professional wrestling championship for tag teams in Championship Wrestling from Florida (CWF) that was used between 1961 and 1969. When the National Wrestling Alliance (NWA) was created in 1948, the Board of Directors decided to allow each NWA member to create its own local version of the NWA World Tag Team Championship. As it is a professional wrestling championship, it is not won or lost competitively, but instead determined by the decision of the bookers of a wrestling promotion. The title is awarded after the chosen team "wins" a match to maintain the illusion that professional wrestling is a competitive sport.

CWF, the NWA's Florida territory, introduced their version of the NWA World Tag Team Championship in January 1961 when they introduced the Von Brauners (Kurt and Karl Von Brauner) as the NWA World Tag Team Champions. Records are unclear on how the Von Brauners became champions; it is possible that they were simply billed as champions upon arrival. In 1969 CWF abandoned the NWA World Tag Team Championship, with the Masked Infernos as the last champions. CWF later used the NWA North American Tag Team Championship, NWA Southern Tag Team Championship, NWA United States Tag Team Championship, and NWA Florida Global Tag Team Championship.

The Von Brauners hold the record for most championship reigns, six in total, as well as the longest combined reigns, with at least 540 days. The Von Brauners' first reign, and the first reign of the championship, lasted at least 196 days, the longest individual reign. Eddie Graham held the championship on seven occasions with various partners. The shortest individual reign lasted nine days as Eddie Graham and Jose Lothario held it from October 25 to November 3, 1966.

Title history

Team reigns by combined length
Key

Individual reigns by combined length
Key

Tournaments

1961

June 1962

August 1962

January 1963

September 1963

Footnotes

References

Championship Wrestling from Florida championships
National Wrestling Alliance championships
Tag team wrestling championships